The 2012–13 UCLA Bruins men's basketball team represented the University of California, Los Angeles during the 2012–13 NCAA Division I men's basketball season.  The Bruins competed in the Pac-12 Conference and were led by head coach Ben Howland. Prior to the start of the season, the Bruins took a Goodwill Tour of China in late August. The Bruins reopened the newly renovated Pauley Pavilion on November 9, 2012 in front of a then record crowd of 13,513. On March 9, 2013, the Bruins clinched the regular season championship of the Pac-12 Conference by defeating Washington, 61–54, to finish conference play with a record of 13–5. They were seeded as the No. 1 team in the Pac-12 Conference tournament in Las Vegas. They were defeated by Oregon in the championship game. A week later, the Bruins were eliminated in the second round of the 2013 NCAA tournament by Minnesota 63–83 to finish the season 25–10.

After the season, on March 25, 2013, coach Ben Howland was fired by UCLA.

Recruiting class

The Bruins also received a notable walk-on this season in the form of Spanish frontcourt project Adrià Gasol, the younger brother of NBA stars Pau and Marc.

Roster

Season

Before the season's opening game, freshman Shabazz Muhammad was declared ineligible to participate by the NCAA. He was ruled to have received improper benefits for travel expenses and lodging during unofficial visits to Duke and North Carolina. After missing three games and an appeal by UCLA, he was reinstated, and his family was required to repay approximately $1,600. He scored 15 points off the bench in his debut in a 78–70 loss to Georgetown in the semifinals of the Legends Classic. Jordan Adams added 22 points in the game, extending his school record to four games of 20-point games by a freshman to start a season. Muhammad became a starter in the next game against Georgia, and he scored a game-high 21 points in a 60–56 win in the Classic's consolation game. The following game, UCLA led Cal Poly by 18 points with 12 minutes remaining before they were upset, 70–68. Earlier in the year, the Bruins needed overtime to defeat another Big West team, UC Irvine. UCLA dropped out of the AP Poll after being ranked No. 11.
UCLA lost 78–69 in the John R. Wooden Classic to the San Diego State Aztecs, the Bruins' first ranked opponent of the year. Although it was a neutral-site game in nearby Anaheim, the crowd favored the Aztecs.

UCLA won its next 10 games, including an upset win over #7 Missouri, before losing to No. 16 Oregon. It followed with an 84–73 road win over No. 6 Arizona behind Muhammad's game-high 23 points. After losing their next two games, to Arizona State and USC, the Bruins won seven of their final nine games, clinching the regular season Pac-12 title in their final regular season game, with a win over Washington in Seattle on March 9. During the game, point guard Larry Drew II broke Pooh Richardson's school record for single-season assists.

Schedule

|-
!colspan=9 style=|Exhibition

|-
!colspan=9 style=|Regular Season

|-
!colspan=9 style=| Pac-12 Tournament 
|-

|-
!colspan=9 style=| NCAA tournament

Notes
 August 22–29, 2012 — The team participates in a China goodwill tour, sponsored by FUSC (the Federation of University Sports of China)
 August 25, 2012 — UCLA defeated Tsinghua University, 116-68
 August 27, 2012 — UCLA defeated Shanghai Jiao Tong University, 72-31
 August 28, 2012 — UCLA defeated Shanghai Sharks, 92-63

 October 26, 2012 – An eight-foot high bronze statue of Coach John Wooden by sculptor Blair Buswell was dedicated.
 October 31, 2012 – Kyle Anderson was cleared by the NCAA to play this season
 November 2, 2012 – Pauley Opening Madness was held with the men and women basketball teams participating.
 November 9, 2012 – "First Ticket Ceremony" was held at Pauley Pavilion's North Plaza at 6:10 p.m. followed by the New Pauley Grand Opening ceremony at 7:30 p.m.
 November 9, 2012 – ISU's Justin Gant scored the first three points and Travis Wear scored the first two points for the Bruins in the new Pauley Pavilion.
 November 25, 2012 – Junior guard Tyler Lamb left the basketball program.
 November 28, 2012 – Junior center Joshua Smith left the program.
 March 2, 2013 – New attendance record of 13,727 was set at Pauley Pavilion
 March 15, 2013 – Jordan Adams broke his right foot at the end of the game where he scored a game-high 24 points against Arizona; his season ended
 March 16, 2013 – Former player Lucius Allen was inducted into the Pac-12 Basketball Hall of Honor
 March 24, 2013 – Ben Howland was relieved of his duties.
 March 30, 2013 – Steve Alford was named the Bruins' 13th head men's basketball coach
 June 27, 2013 – Shabazz Muhammad was drafted in the NBA draft in the 1st round (#14 overall) by the Utah Jazz then was traded to Minnesota Timberwolves

Honors

All-Pac-12

First team
Larry Drew II
Shabazz Muhammad
Second team
Kyle Anderson

Pac-12 All-Freshman
Kyle Anderson
Shabazz Muhammad

References

External links
 2012–13 Season notes and stats

UCLA
UCLA Bruins men's basketball seasons
UCLA
UCLA Bruins men's bask
UCLA Bruins men's bask